CITP may stand for:

Computers and networking - Entertainment control systems (Lighting / Media) 
 Controller Interface Transport Protocol, an open communications protocol for the integration of visualizers, lighting consoles and media servers

Law enforcement training 
 Criminal Investigator Training Program

Organizations 
 Center for Information Technology Policy at Princeton University

Professional certifications 
 Chartered IT Professional, a designation awarded by the British Computer Society for experienced ICT professionals 
 Certified Information Technology Professional, a credential granted by the American Institute of Certified Public Accountants to members with technology expertise
 Certified International Trade Professional, a designation awarded by the Forum for International Trade Training for experienced international trade professionals.